SpankChain is an adult entertainment website and cryptocurrency exchange mostly used for exchanges in the sex work industry. Users pay for services using SpankChain Ethereum-based coin "SPANK". The SpankChain's tokens are sometimes referred to as "SpankCoin".

History 

In April 2018, SpankChain offered a $25,000 reward to sex workers who revealed information about political clients who supported the passing of the FOSTA/SESTA acts, which regulated sex work in the United States. The company reportedly had 6,000 users as of October 2018.

In 2018, a malicious attacker stole 165 Ethers (valued at $40,000) from SpankChain by exploiting a vulnerability in the Ethereum blockchain. After the cryptocurrency bubble of 2018 burst, the company downsized to eight employees.

References

External links 
https://spankchain.com
Cryptocurrencies
Pornography